Ronald Tabak may refer to:

 Ronald John Tabak (died 1984), former vocalist in band Prism; see Prism (band)#Death of Ron Tabak
 Ronald J. Tabak ( 1990s), American attorney and critic of William Henry Hance's death sentence; see William Henry Hance#Controversy